Cerkno Ski Resort is the Slovenian most modern ski resort on Črni Vrh nad Novaki hill near Davča opened in 1984. It is located 10 km away from centre of municipality Cerkno.

It offers total of 18 km ski slopes, 5 km tracks for cross-country skiing and Snowboard Park. It was awarded for best Slovenian ski resort in seasons 2010/11, 2011/12, 2012/13, 2016/17, 2017/18,  2018/19 and 2019/20. There is a hotel and restaurant built in alpine style, situated at the top station. Cerkno summer offerings include hiking and mountain biking. It is the 6th largest ski resort in Slovenia.

Ski area

Ski slopes

Lifts

Other activities
Cross-country skiing — 5 km (3.1 miles)
Mountain bike downhill slope
Cerkno Hotel Spa
Snowboard Park
Hiking

Awards
Voted for the best Slovenian ski resort by visitors and listeners of Radio Slovenia in:

2010/11 season
2011/12 season
2012/13 season
2016/17 season
2017/18 season 
2018/19 season
2019/20 season

Road access 
 Motorway (Slovenia) — Koper to Ljubljana (section) — Vrhnika (exit) — Gorenja Vas — Cerkno
 Motorway (Slovenia) — Koper to Ljubljana (section) — Logatec (exit) — Idrija — Cerkno
 Motorway (Slovenia) — Karawanks Tunnel to Ljubljana (section) — Kranj, Vodice, Šentvid (exits) — Škofja Loka — Cerkno
Nova Gorica — Tolmin — Most na Soči — Cerkno (main road)

See also
List of ski areas and resorts in Slovenia

External links
 cerkno.com official site

Ski areas and resorts in Slovenia